Freedom Festival may refer to:

 America's Freedom Festival at Provo, held annually in Provo, Utah
 Evansville Freedom Festival, held annually in Evansville, Indiana
 Windsor–Detroit International Freedom Festival, a multi-national event held at the border cities of Detroit, Michigan and Windsor, Ontario
 Freedom Festival, Hull, held annually in Kingston upon Hull, United Kingdom

See also
 FreedomFest, a Libertarian festival